Afin Rural District is a rural district (dehestan) in Zohan District, Zirkuh County, South Khorasan Province, Iran. At the 2006 census, its population was 5,311, in 1,412 families.  The rural district has 25 villages.

References 

Rural Districts of South Khorasan Province
Zirkuh County